In category theory, a discipline in mathematics, the notion of topological category has a number of different, inequivalent definitions.

In one approach, a topological category is a category that is enriched over the category of compactly generated Hausdorff spaces. They can be used as a foundation for higher category theory, where they can play the role of (1)-categories. An important example of a topological category in this sense is given by the category of CW complexes, where each set Hom(X,Y) of continuous maps from X to Y is equipped with the compact-open topology. 

In another approach, a topological category is defined as a category  along with a forgetful functor  that maps to the category of sets and has the following three properties:
  admits initial (also known as weak) structures with respect to 
 Constant functions in  lift to -morphisms
 Fibers  are small (they are sets and not proper classes).
An example of a topological category in this sense is the category of all topological spaces with continuous maps, where one uses the standard forgetful functor.

See also

Infinity category
Simplicial category

References

Category theory